The 2019 Gander RV 150 is a NASCAR Gander Outdoors Truck Series race held on July 27, 2019, at Pocono Raceway in Long Pond, Pennsylvania. Contested over 60 laps on the  superspeedway, it was the 14th race of the 2019 NASCAR Gander Outdoors Truck Series season.

Background

Track

The race was held at Pocono Raceway, also known as The Tricky Triangle, which is a superspeedway located in the Pocono Mountains in Long Pond, Pennsylvania. It is the site of two annual Monster Energy NASCAR Cup Series races held several weeks apart in early June and late July, one NASCAR Xfinity Series event in early June, one NASCAR Gander Outdoors Truck Series event in late July, and two ARCA Racing Series events, one in early June and the other in late July.  From 1971 to 1989, and since 2013, the track has also hosted an Indy Car race, currently sanctioned by the IndyCar Series and run in August.

Entry list

Practice

First practice

Final practice

Qualifying

Qualifying results

Race

Summary
Austin Hill started on pole, but Ross Chastain quickly shot past him. In the first turn of the race, Stewart Friesen brought out the caution after he got loose under Sheldon Creed and turned into the outside wall, also getting smacked by Anthony Alfredo. Friesen's truck was damaged to the point where he could not continue, ultimately ending his day before completing a single lap. Alfredo was only able to complete two more laps before his day also ended.

On the restart, Bryan Dauzat spun and immediately brought out the caution again. Chastain dominated and won stage 1. Hill had engine problems on lap 22 and was forced to park his truck in the garage. Chastain pitted with 3 laps remaining in stage 2, giving the stage win to Harrison Burton.

Chastain regained the lead after Burton pitted, and was never challenged again during the race. He won the race ahead of Tyler Ankrum, dedicating the race win to late crew chief Nick Harrison, who had died a week before the race.

Stage Results

Stage One
Laps: 15

Stage Two
Laps: 15

Final Stage Results

Stage Three
Laps: 30

References

2019 in sports in Pennsylvania
Gander RV 150
NASCAR races at Pocono Raceway